Margherita Parini (born 1 September 1972) is an Italian snowboarder.

She was born in Aosta. She competed at the 1998 Winter Olympics, in giant slalom. Her achievements at the World Championships include a bronze medal in the giant slalom in 1997, and a gold medal in giant slalom in 1999.

References

External links 
 

1972 births
Living people
People from Aosta
Italian female snowboarders
Olympic snowboarders of Italy
Snowboarders at the 1998 Winter Olympics
Sportspeople from Aosta Valley
20th-century Italian women